Robert S. Young is professor of coastal geology at Western Carolina University and director of the Program for the Study of Developed Shorelines.

See also
Sea level rise

Sources

Western Carolina University faculty
Living people
Year of birth missing (living people)